WETP-TV (channel 2) is a non-commercial educational television station licensed to Sneedville, Tennessee, United States. It is simulcast full-time over satellite station WKOP-TV (channel 15) in Knoxville. Both are member stations of PBS and jointly brand as East Tennessee PBS. Owned by the East Tennessee Public Communications Corporation, the two stations form a regional network serving both the Knoxville and Tri-Cities areas of East Tennessee. The network's studios and offices are located on East Magnolia Avenue in downtown Knoxville. WETP-TV's transmitter is located atop Short Mountain near Mooresburg, while WKOP-TV's transmitter is situated on Sharp's Ridge in North Knoxville.

History

Early years
WETP-TV was founded on March 15, 1967 as WSJK (Sneedville–Johnson City–Knoxville), the first in a series of four stations that the Tennessee Board of Education would establish over the next 12 years, the others being WLJT in Martin, WTCI in Chattanooga and WCTE in Cookeville. The transmitter was built on Short Mountain near Sneedville not by choice, but by necessity (see below). Studios were located at rented space at the University of Tennessee's communications building in Knoxville with a satellite studio located at East Tennessee State University in Johnson City. Reception was spotty at best even in the Tri-Cities area because of the distance the signal had to travel from Short Mountain, as well as the area's rugged terrain. The Tri-Cities wouldn't get a city-grade signal from PBS until WSBN-TV in Norton, Virginia, started in 1971 as a satellite of WBRA-TV in Roanoke.

However, WSJK was constrained by two issues. First, the 1955 legislation authorizing a public television system in the state mandated that those stations serve the school populations in their areas first, before all other considerations. Also, the channel 2 analog signal traveled a very long distance under most conditions, and WSJK was short-spaced to WDCN-TV in Nashville (now WNPT on channel 8; the channel 2 frequency was later occupied by WKRN-TV), WSB-TV in Atlanta and WFMY-TV in Greensboro, North Carolina. Sneedville is located about halfway between the Tri-Cities and Knoxville (and just a few miles south of the Virginia state line) and was the only location that could best serve the school populations in the most efficient way, while at the same time protecting WDCN, WSB and WFMY from interference.

The Federal Communications Commission (FCC) formally defined the Short Mountain transmitter site "a broadcasting island" because it was so surrounded by possible interference. In granting the construction permit, the FCC stipulated that WSJK's transmitter could not be moved even  in any direction. Moving it west would have caused co-channel interference with WDCN, moving it east would have caused interference with WFMY, and moving it to the south would have caused interference with WSB-TV. However, doing so would have prevented the Knoxville area from getting even a rimshot signal. Thus, Short Mountain was one of only a few broadcasting transmitter sites in the entire U.S. prior to the 2009 digital transition that could not be physically relocated in any direction.

The FCC had already allocated channel 15 to Knoxville for non-commercial use and plans to activate it as a satellite of WSJK cropped up from 1972 onward. There were also attempts to activate a satellite in the Tri-Cities on channel 41. However, they all collapsed, due to a lack of state funding to match the available federal funding, a situation largely caused by the 1970s economic recessions affecting state revenues. Since the Board of Education had begun all but one of its proposed stations by that point, priority was given to activating WCTE for the Upper Cumberland region, the last large area of the state that had no public television service at all; that station did not come online until 1978.

As a result, WSJK became, quite by default, the only public television station in the northern two-thirds of East Tennessee. This left Knoxville as one of the largest markets in the country without a city-grade signal from PBS. Most of the Knoxville area did not get a clear signal from the station until cable arrived in the mid-1970s.

Nonetheless, WSJK managed to make a name for itself in the area. It was the exclusive provider of on-site video at the 1982 World's Fair and also was the first station to air regularly-scheduled broadcasts of Tennessee Volunteers basketball.

A Knoxville station, at last

In 1981, the state legislature passed a law that allowed the state board to transfer its four stations to community organizations (the two largest PBS stations in the state, WKNO-TV in Memphis and WDCN in Nashville were operated by, respectively, a community board and the local school board and were never part of the state system). WSJK was the first to complete the separation in 1983; operational control was transferred to the East Tennessee Public Communications Corporation. Eventually, the state discontinued even token financial support of the four PBS stations after they were emancipated; this did not adversely affect the stations, because their release to community boards had already encouraged them to develop different sources of financial support.

Almost immediately, the new licensee approved plans to reorient WSJK to serve the Tri-Cities and build channel 15 as a WSJK satellite serving Knoxville (though channel 2 still provided "rimshot" coverage of Knoxville over the air). Channel 15 began broadcasting as WKOP-TV on August 15, 1990 on channel 15 from a transmitter and tower located on top of Sharp's Ridge. Although channel 2 is recognized as the main station, its main studios have always been located in Knoxville. In the late 1980s, the station's facilities were moved to East Magnolia Avenue on the other side of Downtown from the UT campus.

In addition to programming offered by PBS, American Public Television, and other public television content providers, original programming that has aired on the station over the years include Scholars Bowl, Riders of the Silver Screen (which moved from its original home, WKCH-TV, around the time WKOP-TV went on the air), The Dr. Bob Show, Fit & Fun, Treasures in Your Attic, Up Close, A Fork in the Road, and Tennessee Life.

In 2000, WSJK-DT (channel 41) and WKOP-DT (channel 17) started operations. On December 25, 2002, WSJK-TV was renamed WETP-TV. For the next seven and a half years, both stations would use the branding "East Tennessee Public Television" or "ETP-TV" for short.

As of March 9, 2009, WETP-DT and WKOP-DT both air PBS World (now simply "World") and Create on their digital subchannels.

In August 2010, both WETP and WKOP rebranded as "East Tennessee PBS."

Technical information

Subchannels
The stations' digital signals are multiplexed:

Analog-to-digital conversion
WETP-TV shut down its analog signal, over VHF channel 2, on February 17, 2009, the original target date in which full-power television in the United States were to transition from analog to digital broadcasts under federal mandate (which was later pushed back to June 12, 2009). The station's digital signal remained on its pre-transition UHF channel 41. Through the use of PSIP, digital television receivers display the station's virtual channel as its former VHF analog channel 2.

WKOP-TV shut down its analog signal, over UHF channel 15, in July 2008, due to an equipment malfunction. The station's digital signal remained on its pre-transition UHF channel 17. Through the use of PSIP, digital television receivers display the station's virtual channel as its former UHF analog channel 15.

Out-of-market cable coverage
In recent years, WETP has been carried on cable in multiple areas within the Charlotte and Greensboro markets in North Carolina. According to Zap2it, WETP has been carried on cable in College Grove, which is within the Nashville market.

References

External links
Official website

ETP-TV
PBS member networks
Television channels and stations established in 1967
1967 establishments in Tennessee